Jane Robelot (born October 9, 1960) is an American television host, who served as a co-anchor of CBS television's This Morning from 1996 to 1999. In the 1980s, she worked at WSPA-TV in Spartanburg, South Carolina, then at then-CBS-owned WCAU TV Philadelphia before moving to CBS. After working for CBS News, she was the primary anchor for WGCL-TV in Atlanta. A native of Greenville, South Carolina, where she graduated from Wade Hampton High School (Greenville, South Carolina), and a graduate of Clemson University, she is currently the 4pm news anchor at WYFF-TV in Greenville, South Carolina. She is married and has one son.

During her tenure at CBS, she won two national Emmy Awards. She also served as daytime co-host of the Nagano Olympics with Mark McEwen.

Since returning to South Carolina, Robelot and her husband Mario DeCarvalho created Carolina Zoom Productions, a high-definition video company.

At WYFF, Robelot worked on "Chronicle: Pauls' Gift" that dealt with a local man's sudden death and his role in saving three strangers. This was done with cooperation of the Greenville Hospital System and LifePoint, South Carolina's organ and tissue recovery agency. A TV special was planned along with public service announcements. The result was an increase in registrations for organ donations in the state along with national and international recognition. Robelot received a George Foster Peabody Award because of her efforts.

Robelot was inducted into the Greenville County, SC Schools Hall of Fame in their 2017 Inaugural Class.

References

1960 births
Television personalities from Atlanta
Clemson University alumni
Greenville/Spartanburg/Asheville television anchors
Living people
Television anchors from Philadelphia
People from Atlanta
People from Greenville, South Carolina
CBS News people
Journalists from Pennsylvania
South Carolina television anchors